Fedco Seeds is a seed company based in Clinton, Maine and founded by C.R. Lawn in 1978. The company is a major supplier of vegetable seeds in the United States, and specializes in varieties for northern growers and short growing seasons. They sell seeds, trees, and bulbs.

The Fedco catalog was founded during the Back-to-the-land movement, becoming a fixture in the movement's continuation.

Fedco Seeds is a cooperative owned 60% by customers and 40% by employees.

Fedco is a signatory of the "Safe Seed Pledge", which commits them to selling non GMO seed. 

During the COVID-19 pandemic, Fedco saw a massive increase in sales during the 2020 and 2021 season.

References

External links
 

Seed companies
Agriculture companies of the United States
Horticultural companies of the United States
American companies established in 1978
Companies based in Maine